Nurafshon (formerly Yangishahr) is a jamoat in Tajikistan. It is located in Lakhsh District, one of the Districts of Republican Subordination. The jamoat has a total population of 6,442 (2015). Villages: Khurramshahr (the seat), Safedjar, Safedorak, Balkh, Yormazor, Korvonguzar, Dulona, Zarbogh.

References

Populated places in Districts of Republican Subordination
Jamoats of Tajikistan